Wickramabahu Central College (National School) (
), founded in 1946, is a Madhya Maha Vidyalaya (central college) located in Gampola in Central Province, Sri Lanka. It is a Buddhist school with approximately 90 teaching staff and 1,500 students. It has been a co-educational school for the past 64 years.

Location and land 

The northern side of the school faces the Ambuluwawa mountain and on the eastern side is the Mahaweli River. The school occupies .

Administration 
The college is funded and directly administered by the Ministry of Education. The principal is the head of school administration, while the college is assisted by two deputy principals in administration and academic sections.

The college has three sections mainly and namely,
 Grades 6 - 9
 Grades 10 - 11
 Grades 12 - 13 (Advanced Level)

Students 
About 1,500 students are studying in all the sections.

Traditions 
The college motto is "Sunatha Dharetha Charatha" in Pali, meaning "Heed good, Bear in mind, Act Accordingly" in English.

History 

The first group of central colleges was established in Sri Lanka in 1943, with 54 central colleges established from 1943 to 1947.

The school was established on 3 January 1946, with four teachers and 55 students under the name of Wallahagoda Central College. It was started in a Buddhist temple, Niyangampaya Raja Maha Viharaya. A. G. G. Perera was the inaugural principal and served the college for six months before leaving on a transfer.

The first students enrolled were selected from schools around Gampola, and within a short period, the number of students increased to 336. The initial classes were conducted in the Dhamma preaching hall of the temple and vacant classrooms at Wallahagoda Primary School. 

The Education Department constructed three temporary halls on a site in Eragoda, where the Gampola Muslim Vidyalaya now exists. In 1950 the college was surrounded by floodwaters for days and was severely damaged. Subsequently, a  site was taken from the Mariyawatta Estate, a rubber plantation, adjacent to Gampola hospital. 

In 1951, the foundation was laid by Prime Minister D. S. Senanayake for a new building, which was declared open in 1954 and the college was moved to the new building. The college was renamed Gampola Central College. High School Certificate classes commenced in 1952.

From 1946 to 1954, all classes were conducted in English medium. In 1955 the medium of education was changed to Sinhalese.

In 1957 Cyril Perera, the college music teacher, composed the school song. Originally it was "Mathawani Gampola Madi Viduhal" because the name of the college was Gampola Madya Vidyalaya or Gampola Central College, with the change of name to Wickramabahu Central College in 1961, the first line of the song changed to "Mathawani Wickramaba Viduhal".

The logo was designed by the school's art master, R. W. Galahitiyawa, and A. J. de Silva in 1957. The motto “Sunatha Dharetha Charatha” was proposed by one of the vice principals Rev. Atabage Rathanajothi, in the same year.

In 1960, with the change of government, the Minister of Education introduced changes to the education system. This restructures led to Gampola Central College becoming a boys-only school. The name of Gampola Central College was changed to Wickramabahu Central College.

In 1965 out of 14 students who sat for the G. C. E. (A/L) examination twelve entered the University of Ceylon in Arts stream. For the first time in 1972, two students entered into the Medical faculty at, University of Ceylon. Four students joined the Science Faculty, University of Ceylon. 

In 1960 the first college football team was formed and took part in Kandy district inter-school football competition. The first cricket team was formed in 1961.

In 2014 the Mahindodaya technical lab was opened and the foundation was laid to construct a technical faculty building.

With the introduction of Technology Subject Stream for A/L Classes in 250 schools in Sri Lanka, the college was upgraded to a 1AB Super school.

Under Education Ministry's 1,000 schools project, the Mahindodaya Technical Laboratory was officially opened by Prime Minister D. M. Jayaratne on 3 June 2014.

Education 

Classes from grade 6 to 11 are in the junior section. To get admitted to Advanced Level section, students have to score the required grades in G.C.E. Ordinary Level (O/L) Examination held island wide by Department of Examinations, Sri Lanka for students in Grade 11. Certain percentage of students are admitted from other schools based on their performance in G.C.E. Ordinary Level Examination. There are about 35 students in a usual classroom. There are four sections in Advanced Level section as follows,
 Technology Section
 Science Section
 Arts Section
 Commerce Section
Students spend two years (in Grade 12 and 13) before sitting their university entrance exam; G.C.E. Advanced Level (A/L) Examination held island wide by Department of Examinations, Sri Lanka.

Past Principals

See also 
 Father of Free Education in Sri Lanka
 Ministry of Education (Sri Lanka)
 National School (Sri Lanka)
 Madhya Maha Vidyalaya
 List of Schools in Sri Lanka
 List of Schools in Central Province, Sri Lanka

References

External links 
 Official Website of Wickramabahu Central College (National School)
 Wickramabahu Central College - Boys Champions - All Island Schools Judo Championship 2007
 Wickramabahu Central College Annual Prize Giving 2015
 Wickramabahu Central College Annual Prize Giving 2012
 Past Pupils' Association, Wickramabahu Central College, Gampola
 Educational Organizations (Schools, National Colleges of Education etc.) in Kandy District connected to School Net Sri Lanka
 Technology Subject Stream objectives & structure by Technology Education Branch, Ministry of Education

1946 establishments in Ceylon
Boys' schools in Sri Lanka
Buddhist schools in Sri Lanka
National schools in Sri Lanka
Schools in Kandy District